Bernard Jean Van Der Linde (14 June 1946 – 20 June 2021) was a Dutch-born French cyclist.

He was a good amateur cyclist in the 1960s, winning in 1966 Paris-Blancafort and in 1967 Paris–Rouen. He became professional in 1968 for Peugeot–BP–Michelin, riding for the team until 1970. He rode for Bic in 1971. As a professional he competed in the highest level cycling races, including the Tour of Flanders and the UCI Road World Championships.

Major results
1967
 1st Paris–Rouen
 2nd Overall Tour du Loir-et-Cher

References

External links
Dutch newspaper articles of Van Der Linde via Delpher

1946 births
2021 deaths
French male cyclists
Dutch emigrants to France
People from Amsterdam